Francesco Carnelutti (15 May 1879 – 8 March 1965) was an Italian jurist and lawyer.  

Born in Udine, Carnelutti graduated in law at the University of Padua. Starting from 1910, he was professor of industrial law at the Bocconi University in Milan, professor of  commercial law at the University of Catania, and professor of civil procedure in his alma mater, at the Bocconi University and at the Sapienza University of Rome.

Carnelutti's studies mainly focused on civil procedural law, but also had a lasting influence in the industrial and bankruptcy law. The journal he founded in 1924 together with scholar , Rivista di diritto processuale civile, together with other works by Chiovenda and Carnelutti, notably the seven volumes of Carnelutti's Lezioni di diritto processuale civile, influenced the Italian legislation, innovating various aspects of the procedural law, and also influenced the  law's university teaching. Carnelutti himself collaborated to the drafting of the Italian Civil Procedure Code in 1940.

After the World War II, Carnelutti's works were increasingly characterized by a mystical vein and by references to Christian values and philosophy. During his career Carnelutti was also a prominent lawyer, protagonist of famous trials such as the Bruneri-Canella case and the trial against Rodolfo Graziani.

Works 

 Lezioni di diritto commerciale, 1910
 Infortuni sul lavoro, 1913-1914
 
 
 La prova civile, 1915
 Studi di diritto civile, 1916
 Studi di diritto industriale, 1916
 Poteri e doveri del giudice in tema di perizia, 1916
 Studi di diritto commerciale, 1917
 Studi di diritto processuale, 1925-28
 Del processo di cognizione, 1926
 Il danno e il reato, 1926
 Lezioni di diritto processuale civile, 1929
 Teoria generale del reato, 1933
 Teoria giuridica della circolazione, 1933
 Teoria del falso, 1935
 Teoria del regolamento collettivo dei rapporti di lavoro, 1936
 Sistema del diritto processuale civile, 1936-38
 Teoria cambiaria, 1937
 Metodologia del diritto, 1939
 Teoria generale del diritto, 1940
 Interpretazione del Padre nostro. Il poema di Gesù, 1941
 La strada, 1941
 Istituzioni del nuovo processo civile italiano, 1942
 Meditazioni, Tumminelli, 1942
 Mio Fratello Daniele, 1943
 La strada, 1943
 Il problema della pena, 1945
 La storia e la fiaba, 1945
 Dialoghi con Francesco, 1947
 Arte del diritto, 1949
 America, 1950
 L'editore, 1952
 Discorsi intorno al diritto, 1953
 Un uomo in prigione, 1953
 Come nasce il diritto, ERI, 1954
 Codice civile commentato (with Walter Bigiavi e Alberto Caltabiano), Cedam, 1955
 Il canto del grillo, 1956
 Le miserie del processo penale, 1957
 Diritto e processo, 1958
 Principi del processo penale, Morano, 1960
 La guerre et la paix, 1962
 Come nasce il Diritto, ERI, 1963
 Come si fa un processo, ERI, 1964

References 
 

1879 births
1965 deaths
20th-century Italian lawyers
University of Padua alumni
Academic staff of the University of Padua
Academic staff of Bocconi University
Academic staff of the University of Catania
Academic staff of the Sapienza University of Rome